Eğerlidereköy, Kızılcahamam is a village in the District of Kızılcahamam, Ankara Province, Turkey.

References

Villages in Kızılcahamam District